The Act for the Marriage of Queen Mary to Philip of Spain (1 Mar. Sess. 3 c. 2), or Queen Mary's Marriage Act, was an Act of the Parliament of England, which was passed in April 1554, to regulate the future marriage and joint reign of Queen Mary I and Philip of Spain, son and heir apparent of the Holy Roman Emperor Charles V.

In reality, the Act seems to have served as a business contract between England and Spain; it specifies what Spain could expect from the union, while at the same time assuring the English that England would not become a satellite of Spain.

The Act 
Under the terms of the marriage treaty, Philip was to enjoy his wife's titles and honours as King of England and Ireland for as long as their marriage should last. All official documents, including Acts of Parliament, were to be dated with both their names (with Philip's preceding Mary's as deemed proper for husband and wife), and the Parliament of England was to be called under the joint authority of the couple. The Act stated that King Philip would take part in governing Mary's realms while reserving most authority for Mary herself. Formally, King Philip was to co-reign with his wife according to the Act, which nevertheless ensured that the new king would not become too powerful; the Act prohibited him from appointing foreigners to any offices, from taking his wife or any child that might be born to them outside her realm, or from claiming the crown for himself should he outlive his wife.

The Act presumed that Mary would have children with Philip and allowed full personal union between England and Ireland and all the realms Philip was to inherit from his father or from his grandmother, Queen Joanna, should Charles, Philip's son by a prior marriage, die childless.

Repeal 
The Act was repealed by the Statute Law Revision Act 1863.

See also
 Jure uxoris
 Treason Act 1554

References

Bibliography 

 
 
 

1554 in law
1554 in England
Acts of the Parliament of England (1485–1603)
Succession to the British crown
Mary I of England
Marriage, unions and partnerships in England
Marriage law
Repealed English legislation
Philip II of Spain